The Best In The Desert (BITD) Racing Association is an American desert off-road racing association, based out of Las Vegas, Nevada. It was founded by Casey Folks, and is currently owned by his sons Daryl and Bryan Folks. BITD runs the Vegas To Reno, the longest off-road race in the United States.

Events

 2022 season

Parker 425 (cars and trucks only): The event began in 1971 as a NORRA event. SCORE International sanctioned the event until 1998. Whiplash Motorsports held the event until BITD began sanctioning it in 2003. The 2008 had over 300 entrants.
Parker 250 (motorcycles, quads and UTVs only)
Vegas to Reno: The flagship event of the series.
Silver State 300
Battle Born 200
UTV Legends Championship (motorcycles, quads and UTVs only)
Adelanto Grand Prix (motorcycles only)
Laughlin Desert Classic (cars and trucks only)
World Hare & Hound Championship (motorcycles, quads and UTVs only)

 Former

Mint 400 (2012-2019)
Bluewater Desert Challenge
Henderson 250

Media
Events are nationally televised on MavTV, its website, and the America One Sports Network.

Divisions

Best In The Desert has classes of Trick Trucks (aka Trophy Truck), buggies, motorcycles, Quads. Various events have different classes of racing vehicles.

Notable drivers
Steve Olliges
Robby Gordon
Mike Groff
Robbie Groff
Rod Hall
Rob MacCachren

References

External links
Official website

Off-road racing series
Auto racing organizations in the United States